is a Japanese idol girl group that formed in 2021. They released their debut single, "Koi no Crouching Start / Omatsuri Debut da ze!", on July 13, 2022.

History 
On March 7, 2021, it was announced by Mizuki Fukumura that a new Hello! Project group would be formed that year with the first members to join the line-up announced as Kirara Yonemura, Kanami Ishiguri, Nanami Kubota and Madoka Saito. It was also revealed that the line-up would be finalised by the end of the year. On July 5, additional members of the group were announced as Natsume Nakayama, Ruli Hiromoto, Miku Nishizaki, and Momo Kitahara. A Hello! Project audition was held starting on July 20, in order to add more members to the group's line-up. On December 12, it was announced by Karin Miyamoto, that the group would be named Ocha Norma and two contestants from the previous audition, Sumire Tashiro and Roko Tsutsui, would join the group.

On January 8, 2022, Ocha Norma digitally released their first song, "Ramen Daisuki Koizumi-san no Uta". On July 13, the group released their debut single "Koi no Crouching Start / Omatsuri Debut da ze!".

Members 
 Madoka Saito (斉藤円香) – leader
 Ruli Hiromoto (広本瑠璃) – sub-leader
 Kanami Ishiguri (石栗奏美)
 Kirara Yonemura (米村姫良々)
 Nanami Kubota (窪田七海)
 Sumire Tashiro (田代すみれ)
 Natsume Nakayama (中山夏月姫)
 Miku Nishizaki (西﨑美空)
 Momo Kitahara (北原もも)
 Roko Tsutsui (筒井澪心)

Discography

Singles

References 

Japanese girl groups
Japanese idol groups
Japanese pop music groups
Musical groups from Tokyo
2021 establishments in Japan
Musical groups established in 2021